The Rambam Square Towers are a complex of two residential skyscrapers in the Israeli city of Beersheba. Rambam Square 1 was completed in 2001, and is 100 meters high, with 26 floors. It was the tallest tower in the city until the completion of Rambam Square 2 in 2003. This tower is 112 meters high with 32 floors and is the tallest residential tower outside of the Gush Dan Tel Aviv Metropolitan Area.

See also
List of skyscrapers in Israel

References
Rambam Square 1 and Rambam Square 2 at Emporis

Buildings and structures in Beersheba
Buildings and structures completed in 2001
Residential buildings completed in 2003
Maimonides
Residential skyscrapers in Israel